Reena Esmail (born 11 February 1983) is an Indian-American music composer of Indian and Western classical music.

Esmail has been commissioned to compose pieces for ensembles including Amherst College Choir and Orchestra, Santa Fe Pro Musica, Conspirare, Los Angeles Master Chorale,  Kronos Quartet, Imani Winds, Richmond Symphony, Town Music Seattle, Albany Symphony, Chicago Sinfonietta,  River Oaks Chamber Orchestra, San Francisco Girls Chorus, Juilliard415, and Yale Institute of Sacred Music.

Esmail attended Los Angeles County High School for the Arts and earned her Bachelor of Music degree in composition from The Juilliard School and her Master’s and Doctorate degrees from Yale School of Music. Her doctoral thesis, entitled "Finding Common Ground: Uniting Practices in Hindustani and Western Art Musicians", explores the methods and challenges of the collaborative process between Hindustani musicians and Western Composers.

Esmail is the composer-in-residence at the Los Angeles Master Chorale and Seattle Symphony. She is an Artistic Director of Shastra, a non-profit organization that promotes cross-cultural music collaboration between the music tradition of India and the West.

She lives in Los Angeles, California.

Honors and awards
United States Artist Fellow in Music 2019
S&R Foundation Washington Award Grand Prize 2019
Kennedy Center for the Performing Arts Citizen Artist Fellow 2017-2018
Two ASCAP Morton Gould Young Composer Awards (2002, 2007)
Walter Hinrichsen Award from the American Academy of Arts and Letters 2012
INK Fellow 2011
Winner in the MTAC-WLA Chamber Music Competition for piano performance
 Fulbright-Nehru Student Research Scholar 2011-2012

Works
Esmail composes for orchestra, solo instrument, chamber ensemble, and voice. Works include Barso Re (2010) for Yale Sur et Veritaal, Yale's Hindi a cappella organization.

References

1983 births
Living people
20th-century classical composers
American music educators
American women music educators
American women classical composers
American classical composers
Indian classical composers
Musicians from Chicago
American musicians of Indian descent
American women musicians of Indian descent
Juilliard School alumni
Yale School of Music alumni
20th-century Indian musicians
21st-century classical composers
20th-century classical pianists
21st-century classical pianists
American classical pianists
American women classical pianists
Pupils of Christopher Rouse (composer)
Pupils of Samuel Adler (composer)
20th-century American pianists
21st-century American pianists
20th-century American women pianists
20th-century American composers
21st-century American women pianists
Educators from Illinois
Classical musicians from Illinois
20th-century women composers
21st-century women composers
20th-century Indian women